Jeff Montgomery may refer to:
Jeff Montgomery (baseball) (born 1962)
Jeffrey Montgomery (1953–2016), LGBT activist
Jeff Montgomery, SNL character played by Will Forte